A megachurch is a church with an unusually large membership that also offers a variety of educational and social activities, usually Protestant or Evangelical. The Hartford Institute for Religion Research defines a megachurch as any Protestant Christian church having 2,000 or more people in average weekend attendance. The megachurch is an organization type rather than a denomination.

The concept originated in the mid 19th century, with the first one established in London, England, in 1861. More emerged in the 20th century, especially in the United States, and expanded rapidly through the 1980s and 1990s. In the early 21st century megachurches were widespread in the US and a growing phenomenon in several African countries, Australia, and elsewhere. In the late 2000s and early 2010s, they became more untraditional, with most newer ones having stadium type seating.

History

The origins of the megachurch movement, with many local congregants who return on a weekly basis, can be traced to the 1800s. There were large churches earlier, but they were considerably rarer. The first evangelical megachurch, the Metropolitan Tabernacle with a 6,000-seat auditorium, was inaugurated in 1861 in London by Charles Spurgeon.

In the United States, in 1923, the Angelus Temple was inaugurated in 1923 with a 5,300-seat auditorium in Los Angeles by Aimee Semple McPherson. 
Most of these churches build their building in the suburbs of large cities, near major roads and highways, to be visible to as many people as possible and easily accessible by car. Some install a large cross there with a view to evangelization and the edification of believers. A study by the Hartford Institute for Religion Research published in 2020 found that 70 percent of American megachurches had a multi-site network and an average of 7.6 services per weekend. The study also found that the majority of US megachurches are located in Florida, Texas, California and Georgia.

Globally, these large congregations are a significant development in Protestant Christianity.

Definition
A megachurch has been defined by Hartford Institute for Religion Research (2006) and others as any Protestant Christian church which at least 2,000 attend in a weekend. The OED suggests that megachurches often include educational and social activities and are usually Protestant or Evangelical denominations.

By region

Africa

Megachurches are found in many countries of Sub-Saharan Africa, including Tanzania, Nigeria, South Africa, Ghana, Kenya, and Uganda. The largest church auditorium, The Glory Dome, was inaugurated in 2018 with 100,000 seats, in Abuja, Nigeria.

The Americas

United States
In 2010, the Hartford Institute's database listed more than 1,300 such megachurches in the United States; according to that data, approximately 50 churches on the list had average attendance exceeding 10,000, with the highest recorded at 47,000 in average attendance. On one weekend in November 2015, around one in ten Protestant churchgoers in the US, or about 5 million people, attended service in a megachurch. 3,000 individual Catholic parishes have 2,000 or more attendants for an average Sunday Mass, but they are not called megachurches as that is a specifically Protestant term.

In the United States, the phenomenon has more than quadrupled in the two decades to 2017.

Asia
In 2007, five of the ten largest Protestant churches were in South Korea.  The largest megachurch in the world by attendance is South Korea's Yoido Full Gospel Church, an Assemblies of God (Pentecostal) church, with more than 830,000 members as of 2007.

Australia

According to Australian scholar Hey (2011), "in Australia, almost all megachurch developments are Pentecostal, or charismatic and neo-Pentecostal offshoots".

One of the first megachurches in Australia was the Christian Outreach Centre (COC), now the International Network of Churches.

One of the most well-known megachurches in Australia is Hillsong Church, which originated in Sydney, New South Wales out of two Christian Life Centre churches and has since planted churches all around Australia and the world. Another significant Australian international Pentecostal network is the C3 Global Network, founded in 1980.

Criticism 
In 2005, Baptist Pastor Al Sharpton criticized megachurches for focusing on "bedroom morals", statements against same-sex marriage and abortion, by ignoring issues of social justice, such as the immorality of war and the erosion of affirmative action. Some megachurches have similarly been criticized for stating they are inclusive while maintaining a strong stance against gay marriage and do not allow sexually active gay members to fully participate in the church.

In 2018, American professor Scot McKnight of Northern Baptist Theological Seminary criticized nondenominational megachurches for the weak external accountability relationship of their leaders, by not being members of a Christian denomination, further exposing them to abuse of power. However, a study by the Hartford Institute for Religion Research published in 2020 found that 60% of American megachurches were members of a Christian denomination.

Some megachurches and their pastors have been accused by critics of promoting a "prosperity gospel", where the poor and vulnerable are encouraged to donate their money to the church rather than saving it, in the hopes that God will bless them with wealth. This in turn increases the wealth of the pastors, with some revealed to wear designer clothing during sermons and own luxury vehicles.

See also

List of the largest evangelical churches
List of the largest evangelical church auditoriums
List of megachurches in the United States
Pentecostalism in Australia

References

 
Christian terminology
Evangelical ecclesiology
Superlatives in religion